is a Japanese software developer. Born in China with partial Japanese descent, he moved to Japan as a child and studied computer science. He worked in the Google Maps development team before moving to Niantic Labs, where he directed the video game Pokémon Go.

Early life and education
Nomura was born in 1986 and grew up as Shi Lei in a poor village in Heilongjiang of Northeastern China. His paternal grandmother was a Japanese who remained in China after the Second World War and married a Chinese man. At the age of nine, his family moved to Japan and Shi Lei settled in Nagano Prefecture, changing his name to Tatsuo Nomura. He initially could not converse in Japanese.

He studied computer engineering at Shinshu University and graduated in 2009. He continued his studies at the Tokyo Institute of Technology under the supervision of Satoshi Matsuoka. He wrote a paper on supercomputing which was well-received by American researchers and earned his master's degree in 2011.

Career
After obtaining his master's, Nomura joined Google's Japan office in 2011 as an engineering staff, and became involved in the development of Google Maps among other projects. He was transferred to the American office in 2013. According to Nomura, he was involved in creating multiple April Fools' Day jokes for Google Maps, including "8-bit Google Maps" (2012) and a treasure hunt (2013).

In 2014, Nomura devised an idea to create a Google Maps April Fools' Day prank which would allow users to hunt Pokémon on their mobile devices. After securing a permission from The Pokémon Company (TPC), which shared an office complex with Google's Japan office, the prank was released in 2014. Nomura's involvement drew the attention of John Hanke, a former leader of the Google Maps division, who requested Nomura contact TPC once more to propose an augmented reality Pokémon game. After the negotiations completed, Nomura accepted an offer from Niantic Labs in 2015 to lead the development of the game which was to be called Pokémon Go. According to The Pokémon Company president Tsunekazu Ishihara, Nomura was selected as lead due to "his diversity beyond nationality and borders".

At Niantic, Nomura was a Senior Product Manager as of 2016. He was initially an engineer for the game, but as the game's team expanded, he transitioned to a product manager.

References

1986 births
Living people
Engineers from Heilongjiang
People from Nagano Prefecture
Google employees
Shinshu University alumni
Tokyo Institute of Technology alumni
Chinese emigrants to Japan
Japanese video game programmers
Pokémon